El Mostafa Nechchadi (born 15 November 1962) is a retired Moroccan long-distance runner who specialized in the marathon.

Nechchadi was a 1988 Olympian in the marathon, but did not finish the race. His personal best time was 2:10:09 hours achieved in 1987, and he held the Moroccan national marathon record for 10 years. He was second in the 1987 London Marathon and ranked #3 in the world for marathon that year. In 1989 he was ranked #1 in the world for half-marathon with 1:02:01 hours.

Now an American citizen, he is a coach for the running group Promotion in Motion International, which includes Catherine Ndereba.

Achievements

References

External links 
 

1962 births
Living people
Moroccan male long-distance runners
Moroccan male marathon runners
Athletics (track and field) coaches
Athletes (track and field) at the 1988 Summer Olympics
Olympic athletes of Morocco
American sportspeople of African descent
American people of Moroccan descent
20th-century Moroccan people
21st-century Moroccan people